Ukraine competed at the 2015 World Championships in Athletics in Beijing, China, from 22 to 30 August 2015, in a team of 57 athletes

Medalists 

The following competitors from Ukraine won medals at the Championships

Results

Men

Track and road events

Field events

Decathlon

Women

Track and road events

Field events

Heptathlon

References

External links 

 Championships' web-page on IAAF's web-site

Nations at the 2015 World Championships in Athletics
World Championships in Athletics
Ukraine at the World Championships in Athletics